Karangatites is a genus of ceratitid ammonites included in the Meekoceratidae, found in the upper Lower Triassic, Olenkean stage, of far eastern Russia.

Species 
 Karangatites evolutus.

References 

 Karangatites in Fossilworks.
 Jack Sepkoski's list of cephalopod genera. 

Meekoceratidae
Ceratitida genera
Fossils of Russia
Early Triassic ammonites